Pelargoderus sijthoffii is a species of beetle in the family Cerambycidae. It was described by Ritsema in 1901.

References

sijthoffii
Beetles described in 1901